Central Andros is one of the districts of the Bahamas, on Andros Island. Its current Chief Councillor is Ms. Natasha Scott. The Member of Parliament for this District is Minister Leon Lundy.

Central Andros is known for its large concentration of blue holes and wide area of bone fishing flats. On a global scale, this particular area is a well known eco-tourism destination.

References

Districts of the Bahamas
Andros, Bahamas